Mission High School may refer to:

 Mission High School (San Francisco, California), a public high school in the San Francisco Unified School District (SFUSD) San Francisco, California
 Mission High School (Mission, Texas), a secondary school located in Mission, Texas
 Mission Continuation High School (Los Angeles)
 San Gabriel Mission High School, an all-girls Catholic College Preparatory high school
 Mission San Jose High School, Fremont, California
 Mission High School, Rawalpindi